Dermomurex is a genus of sea snails, marine gastropod mollusks in the family Muricidae, the murex snails or rock snails.

Species
Species within the genus Dermomurex include:
 
 Dermomurex abyssicolus (Crosse, 1865)
 Dermomurex africanus Vokes, 1978
 Dermomurex agnesae Vokes, 1995
 Dermomurex alabastrum (A. Adams, 1864)
 Dermomurex angustus (Verco, 1895)
 Dermomurex antecessor Vokes, 1975
 Dermomurex antonius Vokes, 1974
 Dermomurex bakeri (Hertlein & Strong, 1951)
 † Dermomurex bathyrhaphe Lozouet, 1999 
 † Dermomurex bezoyensis Lozouet, 1999 
 Dermomurex binghamae Vokes, 1992
 Dermomurex bobyini (Kosuge, 1984)
 Dermomurex boucheti Garrigues & Merle, 2014
 Dermomurex charlesi Houart & Héros, 2013 
 Dermomurex colombi Houart, 2006
 Dermomurex coonsorum Petuch, 2013
 Dermomurex cunninghamae (Berry, 1964)
 † Dermomurex distinctus (Cristofori & Jan, 1832) 
 Dermomurex elizabethae (McGinty, 1940)
 Dermomurex fajouensis Garrigues & Merle, 2014
 Dermomurex fitialeatai Houart, 2015
 Dermomurex glicksteini Petuch, 1987
 Dermomurex gofasi Houart, 1996
 Dermomurex goldsteini Tenison Woods, 1876
 Dermomurex gunteri Vokes, 1985
 Dermomurex gutta Garrigues & Lamy, 2019
 Dermomurex howletti Vokes, 1995
 Dermomurex indentatus (Carpenter, 1857)
 Dermomurex infrons Vokes, 1974
 Dermomurex kaicherae (Petuch, 1987)
 Dermomurex lanceolatus Garrigues & Lamy, 2019
 Dermomurex leali Houart, 1991
 Dermomurex manonae Houart, Héros & Zuccon, 2019
 Dermomurex myrakeenae (Emerson & D'Attilio, 1970)
 Dermomurex neglectus (Habe & Kosuge, 1971)
 † Dermomurex nemethi Z. Kovács, 2018 
 Dermomurex obeliscus (A. Adams, 1853)
 Dermomurex olssoni Vokes, 1989
 Dermomurex oxum Petuch, 1979
 Dermomurex pacei Petuch, 1988
 Dermomurex pasi Vokes, 1993
 Dermomurex paulinae Houart, Héros & Zuccon, 2019
 Dermomurex pauperculus (C. B. Adams, 1850)
 Dermomurex pruvosti Garrigues & Merle, 2014
 Dermomurex raywalkeri Houart, 1986
 Dermomurex sarasuae Vokes, 1992
 Dermomurex scalaroides (Blainville, 1829)
 Dermomurex sepositus Houart, 1993
 † Dermomurex silicatus Darragh, 2017 
 Dermomurex spinosus Garrigues & Lamy, 2017
 Dermomurex tararensis Garrigues & Merle, 2014
 † Dermomurex tenellus (Mayer, 1869) 
 Dermomurex triclotae Houart, 2001
 Dermomurex trivaricosus Houart, Gori & Rosado, 2017
 Dermomurex trondleorum Houart, 1990
 Dermomurex wareni Houart, 1990
 Dermomurex worsfoldi Vokes, 1992

References

 Thiele, J. (1929-1935). Handbuch der systematischen Weichtierkunde. Jena, Gustav Fischer, 1154 pp
 Kuroda T. (1953). On the Japanese species of “Trophon”. Venus (Japanese Journal of Malacology). 17: 186–202.
 Gofas, S.; Le Renard, J.; Bouchet, P. (2001). Mollusca, in: Costello, M.J. et al. (Ed.) (2001). European register of marine species: a check-list of the marine species in Europe and a bibliography of guides to their identification. Collection Patrimoines Naturels, 50: pp. 180–213
 Merle D., Garrigues B. & Pointier J.-P. (2011) Fossil and Recent Muricidae of the world. Part Muricinae. Hackenheim: Conchbooks. 648 pp

External links
 Monterosato T. A. (di) (1890). Conchiglie della profondità del mare di Palermo. Naturalista Siciliano, Palermo, 9(6): 140-151 [1 marzo]; 9(7): 157-166 [1 aprile]; 9(8): 181-191 [1 maggio] 
 Ohio State University: Dermomurex Monterosato, 1890

 
Aspellinae